Old Snake may refer to:

Old Snake (G.I. Joe), an alias of Cobra Commander from the G.I. Joe franchise
Solid Snake, the protagonist of Konami's Metal Gear Solid 4: Guns of the Patriots